Steel Magnolias is a 1989 American comedy-drama film directed by Herbert Ross and starring Academy Award winners Sally Field, Shirley MacLaine, and Olympia Dukakis with Dolly Parton, Daryl Hannah, and Julia Roberts.  The film is a film adaptation of Robert Harling's 1987 play of the same name about the bond a group of women share in a small-town Southern community, and how they cope with the death of one of their own. The supporting cast features Tom Skerritt, Dylan McDermott, Sam Shepard and Kevin J. O'Connor.

Robert Harling based the story in part on his sister, Susan Harling Robinson. She died in 1985 of complications from Type 1 diabetes. In the film, Julia Roberts plays Shelby, the character based on Susan.

Plot
Annelle Dupuy, a shy beauty school graduate, moves to the northwestern Louisiana town of Chinquapin Parish, where Truvy Jones hires her to work in her home-based beauty salon.

Meanwhile, M'Lynn Eatenton and her daughter, Shelby, busily prepare for Shelby's wedding that is being held later that day. Along with Clairee Belcher—the former mayor's cheerful widow—they arrive at Truvy's to have their hair done. While there, Shelby, who has Type 1 diabetes, suffers a hypoglycemic attack, but recovers quickly with the women's help. M'Lynn reveals that due to Shelby's medical condition, her doctor advises against her having children. Shelby considered ending her engagement to her fiancé, Jackson, so he would not be deprived of children.

Grouchy and sarcastic Louisa "Ouiser" Boudreaux arrives at the salon and immediately begins interrogating Annelle about her background. Annelle tearfully reveals that her no-good husband, Bunkie, is evading the police and has taken all their money, her clothes and jewelry, and the car. Annelle further admits she is unsure her marriage is legal. Shelby, sympathetic, invites Annelle to the wedding reception where she meets bartender Sammy DeSoto. Soon after, Annelle, following a short-lived wild streak, becomes deeply religious, annoying everyone, including Sammy.

During the Christmas holidays, Shelby announces she is pregnant. Everyone is thrilled except M’Lynn, knowing the risks. Truvy encourages M'Lynn to instead focus on the joy a new baby brings.

Shelby has a baby boy, Jackson Jr., but soon develops kidney failure requiring regular dialysis. Around Jackson Jr.'s first birthday, Shelby undergoes a successful transplant with M'Lynn's donated kidney. Shelby recovers, but four months later, Jackson arrives home to find her unconscious. Shelby is comatose, having contracted an infection in her central nervous system due to the suppressive therapy that keeps her body from rejecting the kidney. After doctors determine Shelby's condition is irreversible, the family jointly decide to remove her from life support.

After the funeral, M'Lynn breaks down, but the other women comfort her. M'Lynn gradually accepts her daughter's decision to have risked her life in return for a few special years of motherhood and decides to focus her energy on helping Jackson with raising her grandson. Annelle, now married to Sammy and pregnant, tells M'Lynn she wants to name her own baby after Shelby, as she was the reason she and Sammy met. M'Lynn approves, stating, "Life goes on."

At the town Easter egg hunt, Annelle goes into labor and is rushed to the hospital and another life begins.

Cast

Background
The original play dramatized experiences of the family and friends of the play's author following the 1985 death of his sister from diabetic complications after the birth of his namesake nephew and the failure of a family member's donated kidney. A writer friend continuously encouraged him to write it down in order to come to terms with the experience. He did but originally as a short story for his nephew then later to get an understanding of the deceased mother. It evolved in ten days into the play.

Production
Released by TriStar Pictures in the United States on November 15, 1989, it grossed more than $83.7 million at the box office. Harling's first produced screenplay, he adapted the original film script which was then heavily rewritten beyond the on-stage one-set scenario (which had taken place entirely in Truvy's beauty salon) of the stage production: the scenes increased and the sequence was more tightly linked with major holidays than the play; the increased characters beyond the original, all-female play cast caused dialogue changes between on-screen characters (among them, Harling plays the preacher and Truvy has one son instead of two). Natchitoches, Louisiana served as both the 1989 film location and scenario location with historian Robert DeBlieux, a former Natchitoches mayor, as the local advisor. The house where much of the film was shot is now a six-suite B&B, available for rent. The church used for a wedding scene is St Augustine Catholic Church in Natchez.

Reception

 An example of a less enthusiastic critic was Hal Hinson of The Washington Post, who said that it felt "more Hollywood than the South." More enthusiastic was Roger Ebert, who said that the film was "willing to sacrifice its over-all impact for individual moments of humor, and while that leaves us without much to take home, you've got to hand it to them: The moments work". The film received a score of 56 based 13 critics on Metacritic with "mixed or average reviews".

The movie received a limited release on November 15, 1989: it entered the U.S. box office at No. 4 with an opening weekend gross of $5,425,440; by the time of wider release two days later it grossed $15,643,935; stayed in the top 10 for 16 weeks, grossed $83,759,091 domestically with a further $12,145,000 with foreign markets, giving a worldwide gross of $95,904,091.

Home media 
The film was released on VHS on June 19, 1990, and on DVD July 25, 2000, allowing the film to gross a further $40 million. The movie's overall gross was $135,904,091. The film was released on Blu-ray through the boutique label Twilight Time, on September 11, 2012–it has since gone out of print. A 30th anniversary Blu-ray was released on May 28, 2019.

Other versions

Lifetime version 

Lifetime Television Network presented a remake directed by Kenny Leon, who had directed an ABC remake of A Raisin in the Sun (2008), set in Louisiana with black actors in the lead roles: Queen Latifah (M'Lynn), Jill Scott (Truvy), Alfre Woodard (Ouiser), Phylicia Rashād (Clairee), Adepero Oduye (Annelle) and Condola Rashād (Shelby). A review in The New York Times was mixed.

Pilot for TV show 
CBS broadcast on August 17, 1990, a half-hour television pilot sitcom. The pilot, set after the events of the movie, featured the same characters, except for Shelby.

The cast included Cindy Williams as M'Lynn, Sally Kirkland as Truvy, Elaine Stritch as Ouiser, Polly Bergen as Clairee and Sheila McCarthy as Annelle. The show was not picked up to series.

Awards and nominations

See also
List of films featuring diabetes

References

External links

 
 
 
 Diabetes in the Movies
 

1989 films
1980s female buddy films
1989 comedy-drama films
American buddy comedy-drama films
American female buddy films
1980s buddy comedy-drama films
Films scored by Georges Delerue
Films about weddings in the United States
American films based on plays
Films about hairdressers
Films directed by Herbert Ross
Films featuring a Best Supporting Actress Golden Globe-winning performance
Films set in Louisiana
Natchitoches, Louisiana
TriStar Pictures films
Films shot in Louisiana
1989 comedy films
1989 drama films
Films about mother–daughter relationships
1980s English-language films
1980s American films